Carex heterodoxa is a tussock-forming species of perennial sedge in the family Cyperaceae. It is native to the Ankaratra mountains in central of Madagascar.

See also
List of Carex species

References

heterodoxa
Taxa named by Henri Chermezon
Plants described in 1923
Flora of Madagascar